Kildare North or North Kildare may refer to one of two parliamentary constituencies in County Kildare, Ireland:

 Kildare North (Dáil constituency) (since 2002)
 North Kildare (UK Parliament constituency)  (1885–1922)

See also
County Kildare